The End of the Road is a 1919 American silent drama film produced by the American Social Hygiene Association. The film was directed by Lieutenant Edward H. Griffith for the purposes of health propaganda. The plot follows the lives of two young women - one raised by "the right kind of mother" and the other by a mother that is judged to be wrong. This film was targeted at young women with warnings about premarital sex and venereal disease and was notably produced during World War I.

A complete restoration of the film has been created by the National Film Preservation Foundation and may be viewed online.

Plot
As described with colorful language in a film magazine, Mary Lee (Adams), at the age of seven, is told the truth about life by her mother. Vera Lynch (Fair), her playmate, is deceived by her parents in the approved manner. At graduation time Mary is sought in marriage by Paul Horton, but she puts him off to study nursing. Vera's mother sends her off to New York City with instructions to make a money marriage. Mary also goes to New York City to work in a hospital and becomes acquainted with Dr. Bell, who falls in love with her. They rescue Vera from a drunken companion on one occasion, but are unable to prevent her from accepting the unlawful love of the same wealthy young man later on. When she develops a loathsome disease, they ensure that she receives proper medical care. Dr. Bell and Mary go to France for the war in the medical service. Paul Horton previously had made a disgraceful proposition to Mary, and she now accepts Dr. Bell's proposal of marriage. There are numerous subplots involving other characters in the film.

Cast 
Richard Bennett as the Doctor
Claire Adams as Mary Lee
Joyce Fair as Vera Lynch
Raymond McKee
Maude Hill
Robert Cain
Arthur Housman
Alice Brady
Helen Ferguson

Production and release
The End of the Road was sponsored by the Commission on Training Camp Activities (CTCA), a US agency created in 1917 with the primary goal of reducing the spread of venereal disease among US troops. The CTCA produced another film with an anti-VD message, Fit to Fight (later released to the public as Fit to Win), aimed at a male audience.

The film was directed by Edward H. Griffith, who was then director of motion pictures for CTCA. Its writer, Katharine Bement Davis, was a sociologist and director of the Committee on Protective Work for Girls, under the United States Department of War. It was filmed on the Rockefeller family estate in Pocantico Hills, New York by US army cameramen.

The End of the Road was originally intended to be screened for small private audiences of women such as church groups or at YWCAs, with a lecturer speaking through the viewing and guiding discussion, and it was exhibited in this way during the war. After the war, the CTCA allowed the film to be commercially exhibited to the public, through agreements with the American Social Hygiene Association and Public Health Films.

Reception and censorship
The End of the Road was a popular success, but was subject to censorship efforts. The film was banned in Pennsylvania, and the National Association of the Motion Picture Industry ran a campaign attempting to have it banned from Chicago. Reviewers criticized "the graphic nature" of the film, which included depictions of syphilitic lesions.

References

External links 
Complete restoration of The End of the Road viewable via the National Film Preservation Foundation

1919 films
American silent feature films
1919 drama films
American black-and-white films
Silent American drama films
Films directed by Edward H. Griffith
1910s English-language films
1910s American films
Films about sexually transmitted diseases